Nicholas Charles Cavendish, 6th Baron Chesham (7 November 1941–27 August 2009), was a British Conservative politician.

A member of the Cavendish family headed by the Duke of Devonshire, Chesham was the son of John Cavendish, 5th Baron Chesham and Mary Edmunds Marshall. He took his seat in the House of Lords on his father's death in 1989, and served as Captain of the Yeomen of the Guard (Deputy Chief Government Whip in the House of Lords) from 1995 to 1997 in the Conservative administration of John Major. However, he lost his seat in the House of Lords after the passing of the House of Lords Act 1999, which removed the automatic right of hereditary peers to sit in the upper chamber of Parliament. He married first on 4 November 1965 to Susan Donne Beauchamp. They divorced in 1969. Nicholas then married Suzanne Adrienne Byrne, in 1973. He died on 27 August 2009.

They had two sons:
Charles Cavendish, 7th Baron Chesham, b. 11 November 1974 who succeeded his father to become the seventh Baron Chesham.
The Hon. William George Gray Compton, b. 13 April 1980

References 

1941 births
2009 deaths
Nicholas Cavendish, 6th Baron Chesham
6
Eldest sons of British hereditary barons
Conservative Party (UK) Baronesses- and Lords-in-Waiting
Conservative Party (UK) hereditary peers
Chesham